Klown (Danish: Klovn - The Movie) is a 2010 Danish comedy film directed by Mikkel Nørgaard, and written by and starring Frank Hvam and Casper Christensen. It was developed from the successful Danish television series of the same name, in which Hvam and Christensen play fictionalized versions of themselves.

The film was released on December 16, 2010, to mostly positive response.

Cast
 Frank Hvam as Frank
 Casper Christensen as Casper
 Marcus Jezz Petersen as Bo
 Mia Lyhne as Mia Christensen
 Iben Hjejle as Iben
 Lars Hjortshøj as Lars

Release
Klown premiered in Denmark on 16 December 2010 and managed, during the two remaining weeks of December, to become the most watched Danish film of 2010.

By February 2011, the film had sold 848,500 total tickets in a nation with a population of 5.5 million, a figure comparable to the comedy films of Susanne Bier and Lone Scherfig ten years earlier.

The movie had its North American premiere at the Fantasia International Film Festival in Montreal in July 2011, where it won the Cheval Noir award.
The film was also shown in the United States at the Fantastic Fest where it won as best picture and best screenplay in the Gutbuster comedy feature category.

In the autumn of 2011, it was sold for distribution in the United States to Drafthouse Films and 27 July 2012 it was given a limited North American release in Los Angeles, New York City and Austin as well as being available through video on demand services. The following weeks it expanded to several other theaters throughout the US.

Reception

Critical reception
The comedy is based on "uncomfortable" humor featuring self-satire and humorous treatment of taboos. Reviews would often compare it to The Hangover and Curb Your Enthusiasm.

Accolades

Sequels
A sequel, titled Klown Forever, was released in Denmark in 2015 and was released in the United States in late 2016. The first trailer was shown in front of Sausage Party screenings at Alamo Drafthouse theatres.

A third sequel, titled Klown: The Final, was released in Denmark on January 20, 2020.

American adaptation
Warner Bros. has bought the rights to remake Klown with Todd Phillips named as a possible director with Danny McBride to star. On 3 November 2016, it was announced that Sacha Baron Cohen would headline the remake.

References

External links 
 
 
 
 

2010 films
Danish comedy films
Films set in Denmark
Films shot in Denmark
2010s Danish-language films
Films produced by Louise Vesth